Anthony Limbombe Ekango (born 15 July 1994) is a Belgian professional footballer who plays as a winger for Eerste Divisie club Almere City. He can also play as a forward.

Club career

Racing Genk
Born in Mechelen, Limbombe began his youth career with Mechelen in 2000. In 2005, he joined Belgian Pro League side Racing Genk. He made his first team debut at the age of 16 in a 3–1 victory at Lokeren on 18 September 2010. He also played for Genk in the Champions League and the UEFA Europa League. During his career with Racing Genk he won the Belgian Pro League in 2010–11 season, and he also won the Belgian Super Cup in 2011, in total he scored 2 goals in 62 League appearances.

For the second half of the 2013–14 season, Limbombe was sent on loan to Lierse SK where he scored 2 goals in 7 games.

NEC Nijmegen
On 30 August 2014, he signed with Eerste Divisie side N.E.C on a three-year deal with the option of a fourth year. He impressed in his first season at the club, scoring 14 goals and providing numerous assists in his debut season at the club, helping N.E.C. win the Eerste Divisie as champions and gain promotion to Eredivisie.

On 12 August 2015, Limbombe played for N.E.C. against Excelsior in the opening day of the 2015–16 Eredivisie season in a 1–0 victory. A day later, NEC rejected a £1.5 million bid from English side Leeds United for Limbombe. On 22 August, the club announced that Limbombe had been left out of the squad against Ajax due to deeming him 'insufficiently focused' after the interest linking him with Leeds United. However, on 1 September, Leeds ended their interest in Limbombe after failing to up the bid, signing winger Jordan Botaka from Dutch Club Excelsior instead.

After impressing during the 2015–16 season, scoring 7 goals and gaining 7 assists in the Eredivisie, on 1 June 2016, Limbombe amid further interest again from English side Leeds United, handed in a transfer request at NEC. However, Leeds were again unable to agree on a fee with N.E.C for the player.

Club Brugge
On 23 July 2016, Limbombe returned to Belgium to join Club Brugge on a four-year deal for a fee around the margin of £2 million.

Nantes
On 23 August 2018, Limbombe joined French side Nantes on a five-year deal for a fee around the margin of €7 million.

Loan to Standard Liège 
On 26 June 2019, Limbombe joined Belgian side Standard Liège on a one-year loan. His new club secured an option to sign him permanently. After scoring in his first match for the club, he suffered a knee injury in October. In December 2019, it was announced that Limbombe's loan at Standard Liège would be cut short and that he would return to Nantes in January.

Return to Nantes 
Limbombe made no appearances on the field for Nantes in the 2020–21 and 2021–22 season. On 4 April 2022, his contract was terminated by mutual consent.

Almere City
On 26 June 2022, Limbombe signed a two-year contract with Eerste Divisie club Almere City.

International career
Limbombe was born in Belgium to Congolese parents, and is eligible to represent either nation. He represented Belgium at U16 international level and has played at Belgium U17 level. In 2012, he was capped for Belgium U19's.

He was named in the Roberto Martinez Belgian squad for the friendly against Saudi Arabia in Brussels on 27 March. He made his debut in a 4–0 win against Saudi Arabia, as he was subbed in at half-time.

Personal life
Anthony is the older brother of the footballer Bryan and the younger brother of the footballer Stallone Limbombe.

Career statistics

Honours
Racing Genk
 Belgian Pro League: 2010–11
 Belgian Super Cup: 2011

NEC
 Eerste Divisie: 2014–15

Individual
 Ebony Shoe: 2018

References

External links
 
 
 

1994 births
Living people
Sportspeople from Mechelen
Footballers from Antwerp Province
Belgian footballers
Belgium international footballers
Belgium youth international footballers
Belgian people of Democratic Republic of the Congo descent
Association football wingers
K.V. Mechelen players
K.R.C. Genk players
Lierse S.K. players
NEC Nijmegen players
Club Brugge KV players
FC Nantes players
Standard Liège players
Almere City FC players
Belgian Pro League players
Eredivisie players
Eerste Divisie players
Ligue 1 players
Championnat National 2 players
Belgian expatriate footballers
Expatriate footballers in the Netherlands
Belgian expatriate sportspeople in the Netherlands
Expatriate footballers in France
Belgian expatriate sportspeople in France